Václav Tintěra (born 20 March 1893, date of death unknown) was a Czech cyclist. He competed for Bohemia at the 1912 Summer Olympics.

References

External links
 

1893 births
Year of death missing
Czech male cyclists
Olympic cyclists of Bohemia
Cyclists at the 1912 Summer Olympics
Sportspeople from Prague